Krutoy or Krutoi may refer to:

Locations in Russia
Krutoy, Volgograd Oblast
Krutoy Log
Krutoy Ovrag

People
 Igor Krutoy (born 1954), Ukrainian and Russian music composer, performer and producer